The Young Adults were an American rock quintet based in Providence, Rhode Island, United States. They were formed by vocalist/saxophone player Bruce McCrae (aka Rudy Cheeks), vocalist/drummer David Hansen (aka Sport Fisher), drummer Jimmy Whittle, piano player Jeff Shore, guitarist Ed Vallee, and bassist Roy Gilley in the early 1970s.

The former founding Young Adults band member, Thom Enright, died on February 20, 2012, aged 59, from brain cancer. 

in April 2016 McCrae as (The Fabulous Motels/The Young Adults/Rudy Cheeks)  was among the inductees who were brought into the Rhode Island Music Hall of Fame (RIMHOF).

Discography
"Complex World/Beer", 1979, single, Genius Records
Helping Others, 1988, album, Heartbreak Hits
Side A
"Complex World" (4:39)
"A Power Tool Is Not a Toy" (4:12)
"Beer" (3:04)
"Summer Song" (3:45)
"Men" (6:10)
Side B
"Meat Rampage" (4:58)
"Christmas In Japan In July" (3:20)
"Meeting Girls" (3:41)
"New Deal" (3:57)
"Drunken Celebrities" (5:42)

Members
Bruce McCrae (aka Rudy Cheeks) - vocals, saxophone, percussion
David Hansen (aka Sport Fisher) - vocals, drums, guitar
Jeff Shore - piano
Ed Vallee - guitar
Roy Gilley - bass
Thom Enright - bass, guitar (died 2012)
John Rufo - bass
Tom Dequattro - drums (died 2013)
Paul ILL - bass
Jim Whittle - drums (died 2006)

References

Rock music groups from Rhode Island
Musical quintets
Musical groups from Providence, Rhode Island